Konold is a surname. Notable people with the surname include:

Claire Konold (born 1938), American politician
Wulf Konold (1946–2010), German musicologist, dramaturge, and theatre director

See also
Kobold